Nicolò Cesa-Bianchi is a computer scientist and Professor of Computer Science at the Department of Computer Science of the University of Milan.

He is a researcher in the field of machine learning, and co-author of the books "Prediction, Learning, and Games" with Gabor Lugosi and "Regret analysis of stochastic and nonstochastic multi-armed bandit problems"

Research 

His research contributions focus on the following areas: 
 design and analysis of machine learning algorithms, especially in online machine learning
 algorithms for multi-armed bandit problems, with applications to recommender systems and online auctions
 graph analytics, with applications to social networks and bioinformatics

Education 
 1988: MS in Computer Science, University of Milan.
 1993: Ph.D. in Computer Science, University of Milan.

References

Living people
1963 births
Italian computer scientists